Robert Arellano (born July 12, 1969) is an American author, musician and educator from Talent, Oregon.  His literary production includes pioneering work in electronic publishing, graphic-novel editions for Soft Skull Press/Counterpoint, and five novels published by Akashic Books. His guitar-playing for Bonnie 'Prince' Billy is featured on 'I See a Darkness', which Pitchfork magazine named one of the Top 10 albums of the 1990s, and since the 1980s he has been writing and recording songs for solo projects and his group Havanarama.

Life

Arellano was born in 1969 and raised in Summit, New Jersey. After earning both Bachelor (1991) and Masters (1994) degrees from Brown University, he taught for a decade on Brown's Literary Arts faculty. In 1993 he used Storyspace to publish the Internet's first hyperzine, LSD-50, on a Gopher server. In 1996, Sonicnet serialized his groundbreaking hypertext novel Sunshine ’69 on the World Wide Web.  Arellano is a founding member of the Literary Advisory Board of the Electronic Literature Organization and founding director of the Center for Emerging Media and Digital Arts at Southern Oregon University. He has been awarded the Oregon Literary Fellowship in Fiction (2014) and a Rockefeller Foundation Literary Arts Fellowship (2016).

His most recent novel, Havana Libre, about the 1997 terrorist bombings of tourist destinations in Cuba, was published by Akashic Books in 2017. In 2012, Akashic published his novel Curse the Names about a reporter living and working in Los Alamos, New Mexico; and in 2010 his novel Havana Lunar was a finalist for an Edgar Allan Poe Award, nominated by the Mystery Writers of America. He has published fiction and essays in Jane, The Believer, Tin House, and The Village Voice.

Works
As Bobby Rabyd, LSD-50 (1993)
As Bobby Rabyd, Sunshine 69 (1996)
 the World Wide Web's first interactive novel,  Sunshine 69
 Fast Eddie: King of the Bees (2001)   
As Eddy Arellano, Dead in Desemboque: Historias de Amor y Sangre!  (2008)  
 collaboration with artists William Schaff, Richard Schuler, and Alec Thibodeau on a graphic-novel tribute to Mexican comic books
  Don Dimaio of La Plata  (2004),  
 Havana Lunar
Nominated for a 2010 Edgar Award  by the Mystery Writers of America,
 Curse the Names, (2012)  
 Havana Libre, (2017)

Music
As Bob Arellano, he has played guitar with Will Oldham (a.k.a. Bonnie 'Prince' Billy) on the albums I See a Darkness, More Revery, and Joya as well as in performance and on recordings with Papa M (David Pajo), Jodie Jean Marston, the Pathetics  and Havanarama. In March of 2000, Arellano organized an international music exchange in Havana and Pinar del Rio, Cuba called "Rock the Blockade" featuring Cuban performers in concert with Will Oldham, Papa M, Speed to Roam, and Havanarama.

See also
List of electronic literature authors, critics, and works
E-book#History
Electronic literature
Hypertext fiction
Interactive fiction
Literatronica

References

1969 births
Living people
20th-century American novelists
20th-century American male writers
21st-century American novelists
American male novelists
American online publication editors
American mystery writers
Brown University alumni
Brown University faculty
Writers from Summit, New Jersey
Southern Oregon University faculty
Musicians from Summit, New Jersey
21st-century American male writers
Novelists from New Jersey
Novelists from Oregon
People from Talent, Oregon
Electronic literature writers